Russian hip hop refers to hip hop music recorded in Russia or in the Russian language in former Soviet states like Ukraine, Belarus, and Kazakhstan. Hits by Russian rappers are included in the soundtracks of some PC-games and have formed part of several popular internet memes.

Many Russian rap artists have achieved commercial success, including Detsl, Bad Balance, Centr, Kasta, Oxxxymiron and Belarusian artist Seryoga. 

Especially at the end of the 2010s and the beginning of the 2020s, rap has become a very political form of music in Russia. In this respect, rap could be compared to rock in the 1980s, which gave voice to young people critical of the Soviet system, expressed, for example, by Viktor Tsoi's Khochu peremen ("I want changes").  

The increased politicization was most impressively demonstrated at the end of 2018, when a string of concerts were canceled. Among them was a performance by rapper Khaski (real name Dmitry Kuznetsov) in Krasnodar at the end of November. After the local prosecutor's office banned him from performing at Club Bounce on the grounds that the music contained extremist ideas, drug glorification and a call to suicide, the rapper stood on the roof of a car and began singing to his fans in the street until the police took him away for "hooliganism" (chuliganstvo) leading to him initially being sentenced to several days in prison. As a result, many famous rappers gave a solidarity concert for him in Moscow.

History
Poetry is a big part of Russian culture, which has strong influence on earlier hip hop music. Historically Russia had a similar element to today's hip hop such as Chastushka, where two people would take a turn to perform a poem to upbeat music and use satire for a punch line. A Belarusian artist Seryoga, often combines Western rap with the native Russian chastushka. The recording was influenced by the music of Grandmaster Flash and Captain Sensible. These experiments were not generally recognized at that time.

pre-1990s 
The beginnings of Russian hip-hop culture and its musical form rap can be traced back to the late phase of the Soviet Union. However, the first musical works were not yet genuine creations, but essentially adaptations of U.S. compositions. This is also illustrated by the first Russian rap album, which appeared in 1984, created by Aleksandr Astrov around the group Chas Pik in present-day Samara. The song "Rep" included in it was a cover version of the song Rapper's Delight by Sugarhill Gang, released five years earlier.

1990s
Until the beginning of the 1990s, there were not many rap artists in Russia and the Soviet Union.

The pioneers of Russian rap were Mister Maloy, Bad Balance, Malchishnik, Bogdan Titomir. Russian hip hop, just like Canadian hip hop, is inspired by Jamaican music, which hit an upswing during the fall of the Soviet Union.

At the early and middle of '90s appears hip-hop scenes in Moscow (D.O.B Community, White Hot Ice) and Saint Petersburg (DA-108, Baltic Clan).

In late 90s, many new performers, such as Mikhey and Jumangee, STDK, and Detsl, had become popular. Many of them were former members of pre-existing bands. At the end of the '90s and beginning of the 2000s, Rostov-on-Don was considered the center of Russian hip hop subculture, and the most notable representative was Kasta.

2000s
In the early-2000s, the most popular performers were Kasta, Mnogotochie, Detsl, and Bad Balance.

In the mid-2000s, underground bands began to appear and became popular in Moscow (like Smoky Mo, Dymovaya Zavesa, 25/17, Krovostok, Money Makaz, Supreme Playaz, Underwhat, Ddrop, Kazhe Oboima). At the same time in Russia and Belarus, new R&B performers appeared (Maks Lorens, Bianca, Satsura, Band'Eros). Also this period was marked by the appearance of interesting musical projects such as jazz-rap band KREC, ragga-rap band DA BUDZ, glitch-hop project 2HCompany, comedy gangsta rap Krovostok.

In the late 2000s, the Russian rapper ST1M received scandalous popularity after production of his single "Я Рэп" (I'm Rap), featuring Seryoga, in which he was dissing nearly all of the most notable Russian rappers, similar to "How to Rob" by 50 Cent.

In 2007 the group Centr became increasingly popular, partially due to aggressive promotion on the internet, and in 2008 they won an award at the MTV Russia Music Awards. The members of the group were Aleksey Dolmatov, aka Guf, David Nuriev, aka Ptaha ("ptaha" means "a little bird" in Russian) and Vadim Motylyov, aka Slim. Their two albums, «Качели» (Kacheli/Swing) and «Эфир в норме» (Efir v norme /Ether's Fine) became the one of the most popular Russian hip hop albums). In 2008 it won MTV Russia Music Award for Best Hip Hop Project. In 2010 the group disintegrated because of the controversies among its participants and the each of them continued the solo career or joined the other groups. In the 2016 the group reunited and recorded the new album, «Система» (Sistema / The System).

In 2008 Russian musical channel Muz-TV started a hip-hop show Battle for Respect, which led the winner Ant (Zasada Production) to become highly popular. In 2009, Putin spoke at the Battle for Respect competition and on the one hand praised hip-hop culture for the cultural exchange that it reflects. On the other hand, he spoke about drug abuse, which he claimed was linked partly to the scene. Putin warned against the abuse of addictive substances. However, he said that breakdancing was proof that hip-hop could promote a healthy lifestyle, because in his view such impressive and strenuous dances were simply impossible under the influence of drugs.

In the late 2000s - early 2010s the new notable performers appeared on the Gazgolder Records label, owned by Basta (such as AK47,(gamora) Triagrutrica, Tati, Charusha, Slovetsky and Skriptonit, the DJ from Kazakhstan).

2010s
In a 2018 speech, Russian President Vladimir Putin denounced rap music, saying that it would lead to the degradation of Russia and that it rested on the pillars of "sex, drugs and protest." He asked the Council for Culture and Art in St Petersburg to bring rap culture to heel, saying "if it is impossible to stop it, it should be taken over and navigated in a particular way."

2020s
In recent times, Russian Rap has had a cultural impact outside of Russia, with tracks such as "Tripaloski / Tri Poloski - ТРИ ПОЛОСКИ" in 2016. With the emergence of platforms like TikTok, popular internet memes ranging into the english speaking world occurred, in 2020 Ice by Morgenshtern went viral and in 2021 My head is turning like a screw (Моя голова винтом).

Further reading 
Philip Ewell: “Sing Vasya, Sing!”: Vasya Oblomov’s Rap Trios as Political Satire in Putin’s Russia, in: Music & Politics 7,2 (2013), pp. 1–20.

Philip Ewell: Russian Rap in the Era of Vladimir Putin. In: Milosz Miszczynski, Adriana Helbig (eds.), Hip Hop at Europe's Edge: Music, Agency, and Social Change. Indiana University Press 2017, pp. 45–62.

Anastasia Denisova / Aliaksandr Herasimenka: How Russian Rap on YouTube Advances Alternative Political Deliberation. Hegemony, Counter-Hegemony, and Emerging Resistant Publics, in: Social Media + Society 5,2 (2019), pp. 1–11.

Sergey Ivanov: Hip Hop in Russia. How the Cultural Form Emerged in Russia and Established a New Philosophy. In: Sina A. Nitzsche, Walter Grünzweig (eds.), Hip Hop in Europe: Cultural Identities and Transnational Flows. Zürich: LIT 2013 (=Transnational and Transatlantic American Studies 13), pp. 87–102.

Ilya Kukulin: Playing the Revolt. The Cultural Valorization of Russian Rap and Covert Change in Russian Society of the 2010s, in: Russian Literature 118 (2020), pp. 79–105.

Yauheni Kryzhanouski: Managing Dissent in Post-Soviet Authoritarianism. New Censorship of Protest Music in Belarus and Russia, 2000–2018, in: Europe-Asia Studies 74,5 (2022), pp. 760–788.

Ilya Kukulin: The culture of ban. Pop culture, social media and securitization of youth politics in today’s Russia, in: International Journal of Cultural Policy 27,2 (2021), pp. 177–190.

А.Ю. Завалишин, Н.Ю. Костюрина: Русская рэп-культура. Специфика научного анализа // Журнал интегративных исследований культуры, 2020, т. 2, № 1, С. 60–68.

See also 

 Hookah rap

References

 
20th-century music genres
21st-century music genres
Hip hop
1990s in music
2000s in music
2010s in music